Prabhuvinte Makkal is a 2012 Indian Malayalam-language drama film written and directed by Sajeevan Anthikad, and starring Vinay Forrt, Jijoy Rajagopal, Swasika, and Madhu. The film discusses the theme of atheism.

Plot
The film centres around a septuagenarian industrialist called Dayadananda Prabhu. He has two sons, Mani and Siddhartha. Mani is a confirmed atheist. But Siddhartha, in spite of being a physics student, and completing post-graduation in it with high rank, is more into spiritualism and oriental occult. Prabhu wants Siddhartha to marry Devika his classmate, and join the same college as lecturer. But by this time, Sidhartha is hopelessly enamored by spiritualism and the works of Fritjof Kapra, the Austrian born American physicist. He suddenly leaves home to Hrishikesh, the sacred place of Hindus; he is in search of a guru who can teach him Ashtasiddhi (the eight divine yogic powers).

Siddhartha spends almost seven years in Hrishikesh and comes across many divine men and gurus there. At the end of his spiritual wanderings, he achieves ‘realisation’ – of  the dark and diabolic side of spiritual industry, and returns home as a totally changed man. Coming back to his village after eleven years, Siddhartha is overwhelmed at the sight of religious revival in his society. Even Prabhu who was once an irreligious man has become the devotee of a god man. He is also pleasantly surprised to know that Devika still remains unmarried as she could never forget him.

Prabhu is about to hand over 60 acres of his land to the god man to build a super specialty hospital. Siddhartha is very upset with the developments. Before transferring the assets Prabhu dies in a car accident in mysterious circumstances. For the first time in his life, Siddhartha is forced into action. With the staunch support and help of his brother Mani, and Devika, Sidhartha unravels the dark truth behind his father's death. In this effort, he is supported by the timely and honest efforts of Adithya, the Deputy Superintendent of Police.

Cast
 Vinay Forrt as Siddharthan
 Swasika as Siddharathan's fiancé
 Madhu as Siddharathan's father
 Jijoy as Mani, Siddharathan's brother
 Kalabhavan Mani as the police officer
 Prakash Bare as the god-man
 Salim Kumar
  Arun as Rajayogi Sukhdev
 Tovino Thomas as Che Guevara Surendran
 Ambika Mohan 
 Kulappulli Leela
 Narendra Nayak as Himself (cameo appearance)

Production
Prabhuvinte Makkal is the debutant venture of Sajeevan Anthikkad, who has some previous experience in documentary films. The story is loosely based on the life of a real person, who was known for his atheist views.

The film was blocked on YouTube on 11 February 2015. It was uploaded on YouTube on 8 January 2015 by the Kerala Freethinkers Forum, a rationalist and secularist group. Other videos uploaded by the forum on religious bigotry, superstition, and rationalism were also blocked. According to the director, Hindu communal forces were behind the block.

Reception
Paresh.C.Palicha of Rediff.com rated the film 2 out of 5 stars and said that the film "has some interesting insights into religious thought but peters out along the way." He concluded his review writing, "On the whole, Prabhuvinte Makkal, turns out to be a let down because it promised a lot before the release."

References

External links

2010s Malayalam-language films
Indian drama films
2012 directorial debut films
2012 films
2012 drama films